USS LST-570 was a United States Navy  used in the Asiatic-Pacific Theater during World War II.

Construction and commissioning
LST-570 was laid down on 14 April 1944 at Evansville, Indiana, by the Missouri Valley Bridge and Iron Company. She was launched on 22 May 1944, sponsored by Mrs. L. J. Prues, Jr., and commissioned on 9 June 1944.

Service history
Commissioned too late to take part in the Normandy invasion, LST-570 still sailed for the Europe-Africa-Middle East Theater before being assigned to the Pacific Theater of Operations.

Records indicate that on 2 July 1944, LST-570 sailed from Seine Bay, France, with 440 Prisoners of War, in Convoy FCM 21, arriving in Falmouth the next day.

She took part in the Philippines campaign, participating in the Invasion of Lingayen Gulf in January 1945 and the Battle of Okinawa in April through June 1945.
 
Following the war, LST-570 performed occupation duty in the Far East. and saw service in China until mid-November 1945. She returned to the United States and was decommissioned on 14 May 1946 and struck from the Navy list on 19 June that same year. On 31 December 1948, the ship was sold to the Patapsco Scrap Corp., Baltimore, Maryland.

Honors and awards
LST-570 earned two battle stars for her World War II service.

Notes
Citations

Bibliography
Online sources

External links

LST-542-class tank landing ships
World War II amphibious warfare vessels of the United States
Ships built in Evansville, Indiana
1944 ships